Ángel Lorenzo Gómez (born 4 October 1985) is an Argentine footballer who plays as a midfielder for Atlético Uruguay.

Career
Gimnasia y Esgrima became Gómez's second career club in 2003, with the midfielder signing from Club Don Bosco. He made three professional appearances for Gimnasia y Esgrima throughout the 2003–04 Primera B Nacional campaign. They suffered relegation in that season, with Gómez subsequently netting one goal in eleven Torneo Argentino A appearances over one season. 2005 saw Gómez return to Club Don Bosco, prior to agreeing to join Atlético Uruguay of Torneo Argentino B. He remained for a total of seven years, featuring for them in Torneo Argentino B and Torneo Argentino C; following relegation in 2007.

Gómez departed in 2013, joining Sportivo Rivadavia. One goal in six appearances followed for Sportivo Rivadavia in Torneo Argentino B. Gómez joined Torneo Federal A's Juventud Unida in June 2014. He made his debut on 24 August during a 1–0 victory at home to Sarmiento, which was the first of five games in the 2014 campaign; which ended with promotion to Primera B Nacional. In 2015, Gómez made just one start, versus Central Córdoba, as Juventud Unida qualified for the 2015–16 Copa Argentina. Gómez left to rejoin Atlético Uruguay at the conclusion of that season.

Career statistics
.

References

External links

1985 births
Living people
People from Uruguay Department
Argentine footballers
Association football midfielders
Primera Nacional players
Torneo Argentino A players
Torneo Argentino B players
Torneo Argentino C players
Torneo Federal A players
Gimnasia y Esgrima de Concepción del Uruguay footballers
Atlético Uruguay players
Juventud Unida de Gualeguaychú players
Sportspeople from Entre Ríos Province